Villupuram Chinnaiya Manrayar Ganesamoorthy, better known by his stage name Sivaji Ganesan, (1 October 1928 – 21 July 2001) was an Indian actor and producer. He was active in Tamil cinema during the latter half of the 20th century. Sivaji Ganesan is acknowledged as one of the greatest Indian actors of all time and among the most imitated one by other actors. He was known for his versatility and the variety of roles he depicted on screen, which gave him also the Tamil nickname Nadigar Thilagam. In a career that spanned close to five decades, he had acted 288 films in Tamil, Telugu, Kannada, Malayalam and Hindi. Sivaji Ganesan is the only Tamil actor to have played the lead role in over 250 films.

Ganesan was the first Indian actor to win a "Best Actor" award in an International film festival, the Afro-Asian Film Festival held in Cairo, Egypt in 1960. Many leading South Indian actors have stated that their acting was influenced by Ganesan. In 1997, Ganesan was conferred the Dadasaheb Phalke Award, the highest honour for films in India. He was also the first Indian actor to be made a Chevalier of the Ordre des Arts et des Lettres. In addition, he received National Film Award (Special Jury),  four Filmfare Awards South and three Tamil Nadu State Film Awards. 

Ganesan is remembered as an iconic figure of Tamil cinema. Upon his death, The Los Angeles Times described him as "the Marlon Brando of south India's film industry".

Early life 
Ganesan was born on 1 October 1928, as the fourth son of Chinnaiya Manrayar and Rajamani Ammal in Villupuram, India. Early in his career, Ganesan acted under the name V. C. Ganesan. Media outlets said that the initial 'V' stood for Villupuram, though one of Ganesan's sons stated that it stands for Vettaithidal, a village from which their family originates. Without his father's consent, Ganesan decided to join a touring stage drama company at the age of seven. At the age of 10, he moved to Tiruchirappalli and joined a drama troupe in Sangiliyandapuram and began to perform in stage plays. From the drama troupe trainers, he was fortunate enough to learn acting and dancing. He was trained in Bharatanatyam, Kathak and Manipuri dance forms.

Ganesan exhibited the ability to remember lengthy lines easily. The group favoured Ganesan to play the lead and he would continue to do so. His portrayal of Shivaji in the stage play Shivaji Kanda Hindu Rajyam written by C. N. Annadurai earned him the monicker "Sivaji", which was conferred on him at a public function presided over by social reformer Periyar. Since then, he was referred to by the name of "Sivaji".

Film career

Early career: 1952–1959 

Ganesan made his acting debut in the 1952 Tamil film Parasakthi, which was directed by the Krishnan–Panju duo and co-starred actress Pandari Bai. The film became an instant commercial success, running for over 175 days in several theatres, and ran for over 50 days in all the 62 centres it was released, and at the Sri Lanka-based Mailan Theatre, it ran for nearly 40 weeks. Film distributor P. A. Perumal Mudaliar of National Pictures, with the patronage of A. V. Meiyappan of AVM Productions, bought the film rights of Parasakthi. P.A. Perumal cast Ganesan after being impressed with his performance as Nur Jahan in the Sakthi Nadaga Sabha play of the same name. It was he who, in 1950, gave Ganesan a flight ticket to Madras for the screen test for Parasakthi. Ganesan had simultaneously shot for the Telugu-Tamil bilingual film Paradesi / Poongothai, which was supposed to be his actual film to release first, but released much later after Perumal requested its co-producer Anjali Devi to let Parasakthi release first, and she agreed. 

Parasakthi did not begin well for Ganesan. When shooting began and 2000 feet of the film was shot, Meiyappan was dissatisfied with Ganesan's "thin" physique, and wanted him replaced with K. R. Ramasamy. Perumal refused, and Ganesan was retained. Meiyappan was also satisfied with the final results of the film. The initial scenes of Ganesan which he earlier disliked were reshot.  Ganesan was paid a monthly salary of 250 (valued at about US$52.5 in 1952) for acting in the film.The script was written by later Chief Minister of Tamil Nadu, M. Karunanidhi. Since actors who are well-trained in classical dance can effectively showcase expressions called Nava Rasa on their faces, Ganesan went on to become one of the popular actors in Tamil cinema in the 1950s. His unique voice had a greater appeal. His style of dialogue delivery with a long spell of dialogues — like a poetry recitation with much clarity — earned him critical recognition.

Two factors can be attributed the entry of Ganesan into films: The principal artists in Tamil films during the 1940s and 1950s were Telugus, whose acting was not matched by their dialogue delivery in Tamil. (In fact, Sivaji Ganesan lent his voice to Mukkamala Krishna Murthy, a Telugu actor, for a Tamil film Niraparathi. The film was well received by the Tamil audience.) Secondly, the 1950s saw the growth of the Dravidian movement in Tamil Nadu, under the leadership of C. N. Annadurai, and M. Karunanidhi. Their transformation of language skills to films through script writing ensured their instant acceptance. Ganesan's entry into films at this stage of popularity was easy and inevitable, and he could establish himself in a better position.

Andha Naal (1954) was a trendsetter in Tamil cinema because it had no songs and Ganesan played an anti-hero. The film won the president's silver medal the following year. The same year, he co-starred with his competitor M. G. Ramachandran in Koondukkili, where he played the antagonist.

Donning versatile roles: 1954–1968 
His role in the film Veerapandiya Kattabomman won him the Best Actor Award at the Afro-Asian Film Festival held in March 1960 at Cairo. Incidentally, Ganesan was also the first Indian actor to get an award for Best Actor abroad. Often considered to be a landmark film in Tamil cinema, Pasamalar is arguably one of the best films of Sivaji Ganesan and Savitri together. Once again directed by A Bhimsingh, the film has a cult following and rightly so. When it released in 1961, it became a trendsetter of sorts and was a money spinner at the box-office. Post its release, several films based on a similar theme were made, for example, Mullum Malarum. It also won the National Award that year and was remade in several languages.

Uthama Puthiran is the first film to feature Ganesan in dual roles and the first Indian film to have the shots with zoom technique.
Sivaji Ganesan has acted in many Tamil movies co-starring with many popular and talented Tamil actresses of his time. He gave many commercial success films such as 
Palum Pazhamum, Irumbu Thirai, Padikkadha Medhai, Paava Mannippu, Padithal Mattum Podhuma, Aalayamani, Iruvar Ullam, Annai Illam, 
Aandavan Kattalai,  Kappalottiya Thamizhan, Mahabharata (1965), Kai Koduttha Dheivam, Puthiya Paravai and his 100th film, Navarathri whereby ganesan acted nine distinct roles in the film. It is arguably one of Sivaji Ganesan's best films in its tribute to the actor.

He had comedic roles in several movies, such as Kalyanam Panniyum Brahmachari (1954), Sabaash Meena (1958), Ooty Varai Uravu (1967), and Galatta Kalyanam (1968).

Puranic and historical roles: 1965–1969 
His portrayal of Lord Shiva in the movie Thiruvilayadal (1965) won him many accolades. Ganesan could strike a balance between commercial cinema, Mythological cinema and experimental cinema. His epical portrayals in films such as Thiruvilayaadal, Thiruvarutselvar, Saraswati Sabatham, Thirumal Perumai and Thillana Mohanambal won him critical acclaim. He played a variety of roles such as freedom fighters, like Tiruppur Kumaran, Bhagat Singh and epic characters like Karna, Bharatha, Narada, Appar, Nayanmars and Alwars. Spanning genres like epics to Crime thrillers; from romantic escapades to comic flicks and action flicks, Ganesan has covered it all.

Superstardom – varied roles: 1970–1979 

Ganesan played supporting role to Rajendra Kumar in the Hindi film Dharti in 1970, which was a remake of his 1969 Tamil film Sivandha Mann, in which he played the lead role. In the Hindi version, Ganesan played the role which Muthuraman had played in the original. Several directors such as Krishnan–Panju, T. R. Sundaram, T. R. Ramanna, A. P. Nagarajan, L. V. Prasad, B. R. Panthulu, T. Prakash Rao, D. Yoganand, A. Bhim Singh, K. Shankar, C. V. Sridhar, A. C. Tirulokchandar, P. Madhavan, K. S. Gopalakrishnan, Muktha V.Srinivasan, C. V. Rajendran, and K. Vijayan directed Ganesan in different roles. Jaggayya offered his voice to Sivaji when his movies were dubbed into Telugu.

In the 1960s and 1970s his films have been well received and he was able to deliver constant hits. Some of his famous hits during this period are Vasantha Maligai, Gauravam, Thanga Pathakkam and Sathyam. Many of his films inspired remakes in Sinhalese. Films such as Pilot Premnath and Mohana Punnagai were shot in Sri Lanka, with Sri Lankan actors such as Malini Fonseka and Geetha Kumarasinghe playing the female lead. In 1979, he appeared in the biggest blockbuster of his career, Thirisoolam his 200th film, an adaptation of the Kannada film Shankar Guru in which Rajkumar had played the lead role.

Later career: 1980–1999 
Muthal Mariyathai (1985) won him a Filmfare Award and Tamil Nadu State film Award under Best Actor category. The 1990s was a period in which Ganesan started enacting matured roles. In 1992, he acted with Kamal Haasan in the critically acclaimed Thevar Magan, which won him a Special Mention Award at the 40th National Film Awards. His other films released during this period are Pasumpon, Once More, En Aasai Rasave and Mannavaru Chinnavaru, where he was cast in prominent roles. He acted with Mohanlal in the movie Oru Yathramozhi (1997). He worked in Pooparika Varugirom, which released as his last film before his death, however the last film he worked in before his death was Padayappa (1999).

Mentor 
Chinna Ponnusamy Padayatchi is the teacher of theatrical arts who trained Ganesan in his troupe. During an interview with V.S. Srinivasan, Ganesan said: "Theatre has taught me everything. My teacher (Chinna Ponnuswamy Padayachi of Chidambaram) taught me Bharatnatyam, acting, body movements & practically everything. Padayachi, was himself an outstanding stage actor and I learnt in an atmosphere that was reminiscent of an ashram school."

Philanthropic work
Sivaji Ganesan has made many financial contributions during natural disasters and for the educational development. In 1960, K. Kamaraj introduced the Midday Meal Scheme for which Sivaji Ganesan donated one lakh rupees. Sivaji Ganesan  presented a 80 gram gold chain to P. Kakkan, who was living in poverty, and also he donated the entire proceeds from the play 'Thanga Padhakkam' which is held at the Salem Nehru Auditorium. He also donated a large amount of money during the Indo-Pakistani War of 1965. Sivaji ganesan bought the place where Veerapandiya Kattabomman was hanged in Kayatharu and placed a statue of Veerapandiya Kattabomman at his expense which is still remain a monument. He has donated elephants to many temples like Venkateswara Temple, Brihadisvara Temple, Thanjavur.

Political career 

Ganesan started his political career as an activist of the Dravidar Kazhagam. Ganesan joined the Dravida Munnetra Kazhagam after it was founded by C. N. Annadurai in 1949. Until 1956, Ganesan was a staunch supporter of the Dravida Munnetra Kazhagam (DMK). In the 1950s, however, Sivaji Ganesan was criticized for going "against the stated values of rationalism" during a visit to Tirupathi. He left the DMK and joined the Tamil National Party, which was founded by former DMK members. The Indian National Congress eventually absorbed the party. He embraced Congress leader K. Kamaraj's leadership.

In 1962, Ganesan became a strong supporter of the Indian National Congress. Due to his popularity, he was requested to be part of the National Congress Tamil Nadu. His respect for Kamaraj made him support Congress. He was made the Rajya Sabha Member of Parliament by then Prime Minister Indira Gandhi. Indira Gandhi's death in 1984 also brought Ganesan's political career to an end.

After the death of All India Anna Dravida Munnetra Kazhagam (AIADMK) founder and Chief Minister of Tamil Nadu M. G. Ramachandran in 1987, AIADMK broke into two, one headed by his wife V. N. Janaki Ramachandran and other by another Tamil movie star J. Jayalalithaa. Election Commission of India refused to accept either of them as the original AIADMK. Tamil Nadu Congress decided to ally with Jayalalitha's fragment of AIADMK. This move was opposed by Sivaji Ganesan and hence he left the party along with his supporters to form the new party Thamizhaga Munnetra Munnani on 10 February 1988. To popularise the party Ganesan produce a movie titled En Thamizh En Makkal (My Tamil language and my people). At the time the party was created it was considered to be pro-Liberation Tigers of Tamil Eelam. The party opposed the presence of Indian Peace Keeping Force in Sri Lanka stating that the force was trying to wipe out the LTTE and its leader V. Prabhakaran. The party also urged the Government of India to hold talks with the LTTE without any pre- condition. In the 1989 elections, his party lost all of its seats in favor of V. N. Janaki Ramachandran. Sivaji himself was defeated by DMK candidate Durai Chandrasekaran in the Tiruvayaru seat by a difference of 10,643 votes.

He later joined the Janata Dal under VP Singh and rose through the ranks to become the party's state president, but his political career came to an end in 1993.

Political parties

Family 

Ganesan was the fourth son of his family. He had three brothers and one sister. Ganesan married Kamala on May 1, 1952 and had four children. His younger son Prabhu is a notable Tamil actor. Ganesan established a film production company in the late 1950s, now called Sivaji Productions, which is now being looked after by his elder son Ramkumar. He has two daughters Shanthi and Thenmozhi. Two of his grandsons namely Vikram Prabhu and Dushyant Ramkumar have also appeared in films, with Ramkumar's son Dushyanth Ramkumar having the stage name of Junior Sivaji. Moreover, Prabhu's son Vikram Prabhu debuted in the critically acclaimed film Kumki in 2012.

Death 
Suffering from respiratory problems, Ganesan was admitted to the Apollo Hospital in Chennai on 1 July 2001. He also had been suffering from a prolonged heart ailment for about 10 years. He died at 7:45 pm (IST) on 21 July 2001 at the age of 72 just three months prior to his 73rd birthday for which he had special plans. A documentary Parasakthi Muthal Padayappa Varai was made to commemorate Sivaji Ganesan's legacy. He was given a State funeral. His funeral the next day was telecast live on Sun TV and was attended by thousands of viewers, politicians and personalities from the South Indian film fraternity. Ramkumar, performed his last rites at the Besant Nagar Crematorium, Chennai.

International recognition 

When President Gamal Abdel Nasser of Egypt visited India, Sivaji Ganesan was the only individual granted permission by the then-Indian Prime Minister Jawaharlal Nehru, to host a party for Nasser. Nasser was given a number of valuable mementos depicting the civilisation and culture of South India. Sivaji Ganesan was the first artist from India to visit the United States, in the cultural exchange programme of the US government, in 1962, invited by the then-US President John F. Kennedy, where he took the role of India's cultural ambassador. During his visit there, he was honoured by being made the honorary mayor of Niagara Falls, New York for one day and was presented the golden key to the city. The only other Indian who has had this honour before Ganesan was Jawaharlal Nehru. When Sivaji returned from America, there was a huge crowd to receive him at the Madras Airport and M. G. Ramachandran was there. When Sivaji returned from Egypt after winning the best actor award, there was a huge crowd to receive him at the Madras Airport. On 22 March 1976, he went over to Mauritius on an invitation from Prime Minister Ramagoolam and took part in their independence day celebrations and stayed as their government guest for four days.

During his visit to the United States in June 1995, he visited Columbus, Ohio. Participating in the dinner hosted to honour Ganesan, the Mayor of the city, Greg Lashutka honoured him by announcing him as an honorary citizen of Columbus. On the same occasion, the Mayor of Mount Vernon read out and gave him a special welcome citation. The Columbus Tamil Sangam was formulated on that day and Ganesan was made the honorary President of that association.

Although Sivaji appeared less in leading roles after the 1980s, his supporting roles were received positively, as in Thevar Magan, which won him the National Awards Jury's Special Jury award in 1993. Sivaji, incidentally, declined the award.

Acclaim 
Sivaji Ganesan is considered one of the best Indian actors of all time. He was also acknowledged as a consummate actor and one of the most imitated ones. He was praised for his body language and his resounding voice and dialogue delivery. Ganesan is known for his versatility and has acted as a blind man in Palum Pazhamum, a physically handicapped person in Bhaaga Pirivinai, enacting Nine numbers of totally different personas from various social strata and the corresponding body language (gait, voice, facial expression, etc.) in " Navarathiri", thereby becoming probably the first-time in Indian cinema history as an actor reprising Nine roles in a single film and in extension, inspiring subsequent films (at least) in Tamil like "Navarathinam" (the great MGR – starred), "Dasavatharam" (featuring Sivaji's torch-bearer Kamal Haasan), a man with a scared face as in Deiva Magan, a murderer in Pudhiya Paravai, or a traitor as in Andha Naal, the first movie that had no songs at all.

On 1 October 2021, Google commemorated Ganesan's 93rd birth anniversary with a Google Doodle on their Indian homepage.

Filmography 

Sivaji Ganesan's most critically and commercially successful films include:
Parasakthi (1952) Ganesan's first film
Thirumbi Paar (1953)
Antha Naal (1954)
Manohara (1954) 
Thookku Thookki (1954)
Kalvanin Kadhali (1955)
Naan Petra Selvam (1956)
Tenali Raman (1956)
Amara Deepam (1956)
Makkalai Petra Magarasi (1957)
Vanangamudi (1957)
Ambikapathy (1957)
Uthama Puthiran (1958)
Sabaash Meena (1958)
Thanga Padhumai (1959)
Veerapandiya Kattabomman (1959)
Bhaaga Pirivinai (1959)
Irumbu Thirai (1960)
Deivapiravi (1960)
Padikkadha Medhai (1960)
Paava Mannippu (1961)
Pasamalar (1961)
Palum Pazhamum (1961)
Bale Pandiya (1962)
Iruvar Ullam (1963)
Paar Magaley Paar (1963)
Annai Illam (1963)
Karnan (1964)
Aandavan Kattalai (1964) 
Puthiya Paravai (1964) 
Navarathri (1964) 100th Movie
Thiruvilaiyadal (1965)
Saraswati Sabatham (1966)
Kandhan Karunai (1967)
Thiruvarutchelvar (1967)
Iru Malargal (1967)
Ooty Varai Uravu (1967)
Thillana Mohanambal (1968)
Galatta Kalyanam (1968)
Uyarndha Manithan (1968) 125th Movie
Deiva Magan (1969)
Sivantha Mann (1969)
Vietnam Veedu (1970)
Raman Ethanai Ramanadi (1970)
Engirundho Vandhaal (1970)
Sorgam (1970)
Savaale Samali (1971) 150th Movie
Babu (1971)
Raja (1972)
Gnana Oli (1972)
Pattikada Pattanama (1972)
Vasantha Maligai (1972)
Bharatha Vilas (1973)
Raja Raja Cholan (1973)
Gowravam (1973)
Rajapart Rangadurai (1973)
Thanga Pathakkam (1974)
Avanthan Manithan (1975) 175th Movie
Uthaman (1976)
Annan Oru Koyil (1977)
Dheepam (1977)
Andaman Kadhali (1978)
Thyagam (1978)
Ennai Pol Oruvan (1978)
Thirisoolam (1979) 200th Movie
Pattakkathi Bhairavan (1979)
Rishi Moolam (1980)
Ratha Paasam (1980)
kalthoon (1981)
Keezh Vaanam Sivakkum (1981)
Sangili (1982)
Theerpu (1982)
Thunai (1982)
Paritchaikku Neramaachu (1982)
Miruthanga Chakravarthi (1983)
Neethibathi (1983)
Vellai Roja (1983)
Sandhippu (1983)
Vaazhkai (1984)
Muthal Mariyathai (1985)
Raja Rishi (1985)
Padikkadavan (1985)
Saadhanai (1986)
Jallikattu (1987)
Thevar Magan (1992)
Pasumpon (1995)
Once More (1997)
En Aasai Rasave (1998)
Padayappa (1999)

Awards and honours

Civilian honours: national and international

International awards

National Film Awards

Filmfare Awards South

Tamil Nadu State Film Awards

Other honours

Posthumous honours 
Pondicherry (Puducherry) was the first state to erect a statue of Sivaji Ganesan in honour of his acting skills and his huge fan base in the state and it was unveiled by the then Puducherry Chief Minister N. Rangasamy. A statue of Ganesan was erected on Kamarajar Road in Chennai, Tamil Nadu to honour the actor and was unveiled by the then Tamil Nadu Chief Minister M. Karunanidhi in 2006.

Memorial

In 2017, a memorial built at a cost of  28 million was opened in Chennai. Located in Adyar, a southern neighbourhood of the city, it is built in the Tamil style of architecture, adorned with domes, and houses a statue of the actor, which was previously erected on the Marina Beach in 2006.

Bibliography

Notes

References

Further reading

External links 

1928 births
2001 deaths
20th-century Indian male actors
20th-century Indian politicians
Actors in Tamil theatre
Chevaliers of the Ordre des Arts et des Lettres
Dadasaheb Phalke Award recipients
Dravida Munnetra Kazhagam politicians
Film producers from Tamil Nadu
Filmfare Awards South winners
Indian actor-politicians
Indian male film actors
Indian male stage actors
Indian National Congress politicians from Tamil Nadu
Janata Dal politicians
Male actors in Malayalam cinema
Male actors in Tamil cinema
Male actors in Telugu cinema
Nominated members of the Rajya Sabha
People from Thanjavur district
Recipients of the Padma Bhushan in arts
Recipients of the Padma Shri in arts
Special Jury Award (feature film) National Film Award winners
Tamil male actors
Tamil Nadu State Film Awards winners